Václav Bělohradský (born January 17, 1944 Prague) is a Czech philosopher and sociologist.

Life and career
A graduate in philosophy and Czech from Charles University, Prague, from 1970 to 2010s he lived in Italy, where he was Professor of Political Sociology at the University of Trieste. He is said to be a successor of Jan Patočka. He is a representative of biocentrism, which he developed to refusing anthropocentric overestimation of symbol and culture. He also thinks we need to step back from "us" to be able to lay foundations of new and freer society. He co-participated with Chantal Mouffe and Slavoj Žižek at Monument to Transformation. He publishes his political commentaries and essays mainly in Czech daily Právo.

He lives in Prague, Czech Republic.

Works
 Interpretazioni italiane di Wittgenstein, Milan, 1972.
 Ragionamento, azione, società. Sociologia della conoscenza in Vilfredo Pareto, Milan, 1974.
 Il mondo della vita: un problema politico, Milan, 1981.
 Krize eschatologie neosobnosti, London, 1982, 1984.
 Myslet zeleň světa. Rozhovor s K. Hvížďalou, 1985, 1991.
 Kapitalismus a občanské ctnosti, 1992.
 Mezi světy & mezisvěty, 1997.
 Společnost nevolnosti, 2007.
 Mezi světy & mezisvěty: Reloaded, 2013

External links
 
Watch film with Václav Bělohradský "Bye Bye Shanghai" at www.dafilms.com

Czech philosophers
Czech academics
Charles University alumni
1944 births
Living people
People from Prague
Academic staff of the University of Trieste